Nikolay Aleksandrovich Durakov (born 5 December 1934) is a former Soviet bandy player from SKA-Sverdlovsk. He is a seven times world champion.

Honours

Club 
 SKA-Sverdlovsk
 Soviet Champions (9): 1956, 1958, 1959, 1960, 1962, 1966, 1968, 1971, 1974.
 European Cup (1): 1973–74.

Country 
 Soviet Union
 Bandy World Championship: 1957, 1963, 1965, 1967, 1969, 1971, 1973

External links 
 
 Press portrait 

1934 births
Living people
Soviet bandy players
SKA-Sverdlovsk players
Sportspeople from Yekaterinburg